Taylor Eisenhart (born June 14, 1994 in American Fork, Utah) is an American cyclist, who currently rides for American amateur team Imaginary Collective.

Major results

2012
 1st Overall Tour du Pays de Vaud
1st Stages 1 & 2a
 1st Overall Tour de l'Abitibi
1st  Mountains classification
1st Stages 2 & 3 (ITT)
 3rd Overall Trofeo Karlsberg
 10th Time trial, UCI Junior Road World Championships
 10th Overall Rothaus Regio-Tour International
2013
 4th Time trial, National Under-23 Road Championships
 6th Overall Thüringen Rundfahrt der U23
1st  Young rider classification
2014
 National Under-23 Road Championships
1st  Time trial
3rd Road race
 5th Chrono Champenois
2015
 6th Time trial, National Under-23 Road Championships
2016 
 1st Stage 1 (TTT) Giro della Valle d'Aosta
 6th Trofeo Banca Popolare di Vicenza
 7th Overall Tour of Utah
2017
 1st Overall Redlands Bicycle Classic
1st Stage 2
 3rd Overall Tour of the Gila
 4th Overall Colorado Classic
 10th Winston-Salem Cycling Classic

References

External links

1994 births
Living people
American male cyclists
Cyclists from Utah